Farzana Mushtaq Ghani is a Pakistani politician who served as member of the National Assembly of Pakistan from 2008 to 2013, She is also the advisor of Metrix Tech Summit Pakistan's biggest technology Summit.Her husband, Mushtaq Ahmed Ghani, is the current speaker of the provincial Assembly of Khyber Pakhtunkhwa Pakistan.She belongs to the City of Pine & Chinars Abbottabad.

Personal life
Farzana Mushtaq Ghani is wife of Mushtaq Ahmed Ghani. Her Son Harmain Ghani is the co-founder of Metrix Tech Summit Pakistan's biggest technology Summit.

Political career
She was elected to the National Assembly of Pakistan as a candidate of Pakistan Muslim League (Q) on a seat reserved for women from Khyber Pakhtunkhwa in the 2008 Pakistani general election.

References

Pakistani MNAs 2008–2013
Living people
Year of birth missing (living people)